Tom Evslin is an American businessman and politician who was the founder and Chair of NG Advantage LLC, the first company in the United States to truck CNG to large users beyond the reach of natural gas pipelines.

Evslin previously served as Chief Technology Officer for the State of Vermont. Before that he was Chief Recovery Officer responsible for coordinating the State's use of federal stimulus money under the American Recovery and Reinvestment Act (ARRA). He agreed to work for minimum wage and return that money to the State.

Evslin was the co-founder (with his wife Mary), chairman, and CEO of ITXC Corp, a provider of VoIP. The company grew from a startup in 1997 to one of the world's largest carriers of any kind by 2004 when it was acquired. In 2002 Deloitte and Touche named ITXC as the fastest growing technology company in North America.

He was responsible for the conception, launch, and operation of AT&T's first ISP, AT&T WorldNet Service.

At Microsoft, he was responsible for the server products now in Microsoft BackOffice including Microsoft Exchange. Key assets of the Evslins' software company, Solutions, Inc., were sold to Microsoft.

In 1981 and 1982 Evslin was Secretary of Transportation for the State of Vermont.

Personal life
Evslin is the son of author and playwright Bernard Evslin and author and teacher Dorothy Evslin. A novel by Evslin, hackoff.com: an historic murder mystery set in the Internet bubble and rubble was the fiction runner-up for the 2006 Lulu Blooker Prize.

References

External links
Tom Evslin's blog
hackoff.com Tom Evslin's blook (Creative Commons)
freecheckip.com open source shareware by Tom Evslin
Evslin source on github: https://github.com/tevslin

Living people
American telecommunications industry businesspeople
State cabinet secretaries of Vermont
American chief technology officers
American technology company founders
American chairpersons of corporations
American technology chief executives
Businesspeople from New Rochelle, New York
Year of birth missing (living people)